Saša Đorđević (also transliterated Saša Djordjević; born August 4, 1981) is a Serbian footballer whose last known club was FC Bunyodkor in Uzbek League.

He previously played for FK Bane, FK Rad in his domestic league and Bosnia and Herzegovina side FK Željezničar Sarajevo.

References

External links
 
 
  

1981 births
Living people
Sportspeople from Kraljevo
Serbian footballers
Serbian expatriate footballers
FK Rad players
Serbian SuperLiga players
FK Željezničar Sarajevo players
Expatriate footballers in Bosnia and Herzegovina
FC Shakhter Karagandy players
FC Bunyodkor players
Expatriate footballers in Kazakhstan
Association football defenders
Serbian expatriate sportspeople in Kazakhstan